Betong is the southernmost district (amphoe) of Yala province, southern Thailand.

Geography
Betong is on the Malaysian border. To the north is Than To, to the east is Chanae, (Narathiwat province). To the south is the Malaysian state of Perak and to the west is Kedah.

History
In the past, this area was under Mueang Raman, Monthon Pattani. It was upgraded to a district in 1868 with the name Yarom. In 1930 the district name was changed to Betong.

The name Betong is the Thai corruption of Betung, its original Malay name means 'bamboo'.

Population

In Betong, ethnic Thai Chinese and Thai Malay Muslims both outnumber native Buddhist Thais. At present there are five Chinese organizations.

Economy
Along with highways and roadways, the district is now connected by air with the help of Betong Airport. Currently, Nok Air and Bangkok Airways are operating to and from the airport, and in the future, Malaysia's Firefly Airlines has plans to fly to Betong.

The historically difficult travel to the capital district resulted in Betong being the only district in Thailand with its own vehicle registrar and license plate.

Administration

Central administration 

Betong is divided into five sub-districts (tambons), which are further subdivided into 32 administrative villages (mubans).

Local administration 
There is one town (thesaban mueang) in the district:
 Betong consisting of sub-district Betong.

There is one sub-district municipality (thesaban tambon) in the district:
 Than Nam Thip consisting of sub-district Than Nam Thip.

There are three sub-district administrative organizations (SAO) in the district:
 Yarom consisting of sub-district Yarom.
 Tano Maero consisting of sub-district Tano Maero.
 Aiyoeweng consisting of sub-district Aiyoeweng.

Gallery

References

External links
amphoe.com

Districts of Yala province